Wangchuk or Wangchuck is a given name and surname. Notable people with the name include:

Daja Wangchuk Meston (born 1970), author and Tibet activist
Dorji Wangmo Wangchuck (born 1955), one of the four wives and queens of Bhutanese king Jigme Singye Wangchuck
House of Wangchuck, rulers of Bhutan since it was reunified in 1907
Jigme Dorji Wangchuck (1928–1972), the third king of Bhutan from 1952 to 1972
Jigme Khesar Namgyel Wangchuck (born 1980), the fifth king of Bhutan, current Druk Gyalpo
Jigme Singye Wangchuck (born 1955), the fourth king of Bhutan, current king father 
Jigme Wangchuck (1905–1952), the second king of Bhutan from 1926 to 1952
Jigyel Ugyen Wangchuck (born 1984), prince of Bhutan
Ugyen Jigme Wangchuck (born 1994), prince of Bhutan
Jigme Dorji Wangchuck (born 1986), prince and regent of Bhutan
Euphelma Choden Wangchuck (born 1993), princess of Bhutan
Jetsun Pema Wangchuck (born 1990), only wife and queen of Bhutanese king Jigme Khesar Namgyel Wangchuck
Jigme Namgyel Wangchuck (born 2016), current crown prince of Bhutan
Jigme Ugyen Wangchuck (born 2020), prince of Bhutan
Chimi Yangzom Wangchuck (born 1980), princess of Bhutan
Phuntsho Choden Wangchuck (1911–2003), former queen grandmother of Bhutan, first wife of king Jigme Wangchuck
Pema Dechen Wangchuck (1918–1991), former queen grandmother of Bhutan, second wife of king Jigme Wangchuck
Kesang Choden Wangchuck (born 1930), queen grandmother of Bhutan, only wife of king Jigme Dorji Wangchuck
Kesang Choden Wangchuck (born 1982), princess of Bhutan
Khamsum Singye Wangchuck (born 1985), prince of Bhutan
Khandu Wangchuk (born 1950), political figure in Bhutan
Sangay Choden Wangchuck (born 1963), one of the four wives and queens of Bhutanese king Jigme Singye Wangchuck
Sonam Wangchuk (born 1964), Indian Army officer
Sonam Wangchuk (born 1966), engineer, innovator and education reformist
Sonam Dechen Wangchuck (born 1981), princess of Bhutan
Dechen Yangzom Wangchuck (born 1981), princess of Bhutan
Tenpai Wangchuk (1855–1882), the 8th Panchen Lama of Tibet
Tshering Pem Wangchuck, one of the four wives and queens of Bhutanese king Jigme Singye Wangchuck
Tshering Yangdon Wangchuck, one of the four wives and queens of Bhutanese king Jigme Singye Wangchuck (mother of current king)
Ugyen Wangchuck (1861–1926), the first king of Bhutan from 1907 to 1926
Wangchuk Dorje (1556–1603), the ninth Gyalwa Karmapa, head of the Kagyu School of Tibetan Buddhism
Wangchuk Namgyal (born 1953), the second son of Palden Thondup Namgyal, the last sovereign king of Sikkim
Wangchuk Namgyel (born 1964), educationist and politician figure in Bhutan
Sangay Wangchuk (born 1981), long-distance runner

Dzongkha-language surnames
Surnames of Bhutanese origin
Surnames of Nepalese origin